The spiny turtle (Heosemys spinosa) is a South-East Asian turtle species. It inhabits lowland and hill rainforest, usually in the vicinity of small streams, mainly in hill areas up to 900 m above sea level.It is found in Myanmar, Thailand and Malaysia.

Description

The origin of its common and specific name is immediately apparent from the sharp, pointed, spiky-edged carapace, and spiny keel, of this unique turtle, also known as the 'cog-wheel turtle'.

Distribution
The spiny turtle is known from Brunei, Indonesia, Malaysia, Myanmar, the Philippines, Singapore, and Thailand.

Reproduction
Mating behaviour appears to be triggered by rain; in captivity, spraying males with water results in them chasing females and attempting to mount. Nothing is known of nesting behaviour in the wild. One, two, or rarely three eggs are laid per clutch; in captivity, laying usually occurs in the night or early morning. Females produce up to three clutches per year. A plastron hinge develops to ease laying. It has been bred in captivity several times; in three cases the incubation time was 106, 110, and 145 days.

References

Bibliography

External links
ARKive - images and movies of the spiny turtle (Heosemys spinosa)

Heosemys
Reptiles of Indonesia
Reptiles of Thailand
Reptiles of the Philippines
Reptiles described in 1830
Taxa named by John Edward Gray
Reptiles of Borneo